Mahonia retinervis is a shrub in the family Berberidaceae described as a species in 1985. It is endemic to  China in the Guangxi and Yunnan Provinces.

Mahonia retinervis (syn Berberis reticulinervia) should not be confused with Berberis reticulinervis

References

Endemic flora of China
retinervis
Plants described in 1985